Velimir Živojinović may refer to:

 Massuka Živojinović (1886–1974)
 Bata Živojinović (1933–2016)